Zhou Hong (born 4 May 1987), or Jessie Zhou, is a Chinese actress and model.

Career 
Zhou made her acting debut in famous TV commercials of Head&Shoulders of P&G, Pepsi, Nokia, KFC, Wrigley, and many other major brands, television series Wen Rou de Huang Yan (温柔的谎言), and later received recognition for her memorable roles in various movies and television series including Beijing Love Story (北京爱情故事), My Economical Man (我的经济适用男), In Love with Power (美人无泪), Legend of Lu Zhen (陆贞传奇), Obstetrician (产科医生), Love Deposit (爱情银行), Night Mail (死亡邮件), and The Mirror (魔镜3D).

Filmography

Films

Television series

References

External links

1987 births
Living people
Actresses from Beijing
21st-century Chinese actresses
Chinese film actresses
Chinese television actresses